Handball is a sport in which players hit a ball with a hand or fist against a wall in such a way as to make a shot the opposition cannot return. It has variants:

 American handball
 Australian handball
 Gaelic handball
 Fives

See also 

 Handball (disambiguation), for handball games not involving a wall